Wig Wamania is the second studio album by Norwegian glam metal band Wig Wam. The album was released in 2006 on 13 March. The debut single "Gonna Get You Someday" was released on 6 February 2006 and was also featured in the 2006 movie "Lange Flate Baller".

Track listing

Release history 

Wig Wam albums
2006 albums